Toijala is a former town and municipality of Finland, located some  south of Tampere. On 1 January 2007, it was consolidated with Viiala to form the town of Akaa.

Toijala is known as an important railway crossroads. The Helsinki–Tampere and Turku–Tampere tracks meet at Toijala railway station.

Toijala is located in the province of Western Finland and is part of the Pirkanmaa region. The municipality was unilingually Finnish.

Until 2015, Toijala hosted a Nokia office which since 1997 collaborated with Päivölän Kansanopisto by having some of its students work as paid interns for 12 hours/week.

On 4 April 2014, ten residents of Toijala became multi-millionaires when they won the record Eurojackpot of €57 million.

Notable people
Jarkko Ahola, musician (b. 1977)
Harri Holkeri, 36th Prime Minister of Finland (1937–2011)
Sasu Hovi, ice hockey player (b. 1982)
 Aki Kaurismäki, screenwriter and film director (b. 1957)
 Mika Kaurismäki, film director (b. 1955)
Eveliina Similä, Olympic ice hockey player (b. 1978)
 Aki Sirkesalo, singer (1962–2004)
Arvo Ylppö, pediatrician, professor, and archiater; credited as the father of Finland's public child welfare clinic system (1887–1992)

International relations

Twin towns — Sister cities
Toijala is twinned with:
  Nanchang, China (1997)
  Hallsberg, Sweden (1946)

See also
 Kylmäkoski

References

External links

 Town of Akaa – Official website

Populated places disestablished in 2007
Former municipalities of Finland
Akaa